Valhalla Glacier is a small glacier in the Asgard Range located between Mount Valhalla and Conrow Glacier. It flows part way down the north wall of the range toward Wright Valley. It was named by the Advisory Committee on Antarctic Names (US-ACAN) and the New Zealand Antarctic Place-Names Committee (NZ-APC) in consultation.

Glaciers of the Asgard Range
Glaciers of McMurdo Dry Valleys